The government of Adrián Barbón was formed on 25 July 2019, following the latter's election as President of the Principality of Asturias by the General Junta of the Principality of Asturias on 15 July and his swearing-in on 17 July, as a result of the Spanish Socialist Workers' Party (PSOE) emerging as the largest parliamentary force at the 2019 regional election.

The cabinet comprises members of the PSOE and a number of independents.

Investiture

Cabinet changes
Barbón's government saw a number of cabinet changes during its tenure:
On 24 June 2020, the ministries of Infrastructures, Environment and Climatic Change and the Rural Development, Agro-livestocks and Fisheries were reorganized into the Regional Administration, Environment and Climatic Change and the Rural Affairs and Territorial Cohesion portfolios, respectively, with their previous officeholders remaining in their posts.
On 25 July 2021, it was announced that Lydia Espina would replace Carmen Suárez as minister of Education, a move which was formalized on 29 July.

Council of Government
The Council of Government of the Principality of Asturias is structured into the offices for the president, the vice president and 10 ministries.

Notes

References

2019 establishments in Asturias
Cabinets of Asturias
Cabinets established in 2019
Current governments